Meliha İsmailoğlu (born Meliha Smajlović, 17 September 1993 in Gradačac) is a Bosnian-Turkish volleyball player. Currently, she plays for Fenerbahçe. İsmailoğlu is a member of the Turkey women's national volleyball team.

Career

Clubs
The daughter of a former basketball player, she too aspired to become a basketball player. However, due to lack of a women's basketball team in her hometown, she chose playing volleyball. She began her sports career at the age of eight in the club Kula Gradacac in her hometown. In 2009 and 2011, she was named "Player of the Year". In the summer time, she played also beach volleyball in Bosnia Herzegovina.

In 2011, İsmailoğlu was invited to Turkey by the Ankara-based İller Bankası. In May 2014, she signed with Fenerbahçe.

She transferred to Eczacıbaşı VitrA in 2017 and Vakıfbank in 2019. Finally she returned to Fenerbahçe in 2021.

National team
İsmailoğlu was a member of the Bosnia and Herzegovina youth and juniors national teams. Her double citizenship enabled her to opt in playing for the Turkey women's national volleyball team. She played at the 2014 Women's European Volleyball League that won the gold medal.

She represented Turkey at the qualification round for beach volleyball at the 2016 Summer Olympics.

Awards

National team
 2014 Women's European Volleyball League -  champion 
 2014 Grand Prix finals - 4th place
 2015 Montreux Volley Masters - champion
 2015 European Games - champion
 2015 FIVB Volleyball Women's U23 World Championship - 
 2018 Nations League -   Silver Medal
 2019 European Championship -  Silver Medal
 2021 Nations League -   Bronze Medal
 2021 European Championship -  Bronze Medal

Club
 2014 Turkish Super Cup –  Runner-Up, with Fenerbahçe Grundig
 2014–15 Turkish Cup –  Champion, with Fenerbahçe Grundig
 2014–15 Turkish Women's Volleyball League –  Champion, with Fenerbahçe Grundig
 2015-2016 Turkish cup - Champion, with Fenerbahce Grundig
 2015-2016 CEV Champions League - bronze medalist with Fenerbahce Grundig
 2016–17 Turkish Cup –  Champion, with Fenerbahçe
 2019 FIVB Club World Championship –  Bronze medal, with VakıfBank
 2020 Turkish Super Cup -  Runner-Up, with Vakıfbank
 2020–21 Turkish Cup –  Champion, with Vakıfbank
 2020–21 Turkish Women's Volleyball League –  Champion, with Vakıfbank
 2020-21 CEV Champions League -  Silver Medal, with Vakıfbank
 2021–22 Turkish Super Cup -  Champion, with Fenerbahçe Beko

Individuals
 Player of the Year – 2009 and 2011 in Bosnia and Herzegovina

See also
 Turkish women in sports

References

1993 births
Living people
Bosnia and Herzegovina women's volleyball players
Bosnia and Herzegovina emigrants to Turkey
Turkish women's volleyball players
Turkish beach volleyball players
Women's beach volleyball players
Volleyball players at the 2015 European Games
European Games gold medalists for Turkey
European Games medalists in volleyball
İller Bankası volleyballers
Fenerbahçe volleyballers
People from Gradačac
Turkish people of Bosniak descent
Naturalized citizens of Turkey
Turkey women's international volleyball players
Volleyball players at the 2020 Summer Olympics
Olympic volleyball players of Turkey